There are at least 3 named lakes and reservoirs in Boone County, Arkansas.

Lakes
According to the United States Geological Survey, there are no named lakes in Boone County.

Reservoirs
Beaver Lodge Lake, el.  
Bull Shoals Lake, el.  
Table Rock Lake, el.

See also
 List of lakes in Arkansas

Notes

Bodies of water of Boone County, Arkansas
Boone